Maggie Shnayerson (born Margot Beahan Shnayerson June 20, 1981 in New York, NY) is an American journalist and blogger. She was an editor at Gawker Media's flagship site, Gawker.com and has written for TIME magazine, the New York Sun, and the New York Post. Before joining Gawker, Shnayerson was the public relations director for the Village Voice and the New York Sun.

While at Gawker, Shnayerson's coverage of benefit cuts for freelancers working at media giant Viacom was credited by The Nation as having "helped instigate one of the most unlikely and successful labor campaigns of recent years." On February 25, 2008, Shnayerson was fired via email by Gawker Media publisher Nick Denton for failing to bring in enough page views under the company's new web traffic-based payment system.  Several other Gawker editors left the site shortly before Shnayerson's departure, citing the new compensation scheme among their reasons for doing so.

Personal
Shnayerson is a graduate of Dartmouth College and attended The Brearley School and Holderness School. She's the daughter of the journalist and editor Robert Shnayerson, a former editor at TIME and of Harper's  magazine. She is also the sister of Vanity Fair journalist Michael Shnayerson.

References

External links
MaggieShnayerson.com
Nolan, Hamilton. Newsmakers: Shnayerson helps the Voice send a new message. PRWeek March 26, 2007
Balk, Alex. Web Outfit To "Change Journalism Forever" With Pay-For-Traffic Scheme. Gawker.com September 5, 2007
Permalancers Unite! The Nation, December 13, 2007
Dumenco, Simon. Blogger Smackdown, Life Pre-MySpace and What's Truly Obscene, Advertising Age, March 3, 2008
Maggie Shnayerson Out At Gawker, The New York Observer, February 25, 2008
Ousted Editor: 'Gawker Shouldn't Be a Depository for the Latest Viral Video,' Mediabistro.com. February 25, 2008
Who should really be sacked at Gawker? The Guardian February 27, 2008
Gawker.com

American women journalists
American bloggers
American reporters and correspondents
Dartmouth College alumni
Living people
1981 births
The New York Sun people
The Village Voice people
Gawker Media
Brearley School alumni
21st-century American non-fiction writers
Holderness School alumni
American women bloggers
21st-century American women writers